Mia Morris Saraille (born February 13, 1965 in Ibadan, Nigeria) is a former Member of the North Carolina House of Representatives, elected to serve three consecutive terms, representing House District 18 (1996-2002).   She was the first and so far only Republican  and first woman elected in history of House District 18. She has a B.A. in French and Philosophy from the University of San Francisco.

Career
Before being elected she worked as a:
Legislative Liaison for the office of the Speaker of the North Carolina House of Representatives (1995)
Member of Campaign Staff, Bush/Quayle Campaign (1992)
Special Assistant to the President for Presidential Personnel, The White House, George H. W. Bush Administration (1988-1989)
Member of Vice-President Dan Quayle's Advance Team, Bush/Quayle Administration (1988)

References

External links
 North Carolina Center for Public Policy and Research

1965 births
Living people
Members of the North Carolina House of Representatives
Women state legislators in North Carolina
21st-century American politicians
21st-century American women politicians